Tartar Lamb is an experimental avant-garde band, consisting of Toby Driver and Mia Matsumiya, both leading members of the experimental band Kayo Dot. The band originally was formed in 2006 as a means for Toby Driver to experiment with his ideas for a guitar-violin duo. The duo released their first album, Sixty Metonymies, in 2007. The band was augmented by trumpet and percussion by Tim Byrnes and Andrew Greenwald, respectively. In 2011, the band returned with their sophomore effort, Polyimage of Known Exits, under the name Tartar Lamb II. This album was funded entirely by fans via a Kickstarter project.

Discography 
 Sixty Metonymies (2007)
 Polyimage of Known Exits (2011)
 Krakow (2011) http://soundessence-studio.com/projects/kayo-dot-tartar-lamb-ii-krakow/

Lineup 
 Toby Driver (2006–present) - electric guitar
 Mia Matsumiya (2006–present) - violin, electric violin

References 

Avant-garde music groups
Experimental musical groups
Contemporary classical music ensembles
American musical duos
Rock music duos
Musical groups established in 2006